Trent Frederic (born February 11, 1998) is an American professional ice hockey forward for the  Boston Bruins of the National Hockey League (NHL). The Bruins selected him in the first round, 29th overall, of the 2016 NHL Entry Draft.

Born and raised in St. Louis, Missouri, Frederic was a childhood fan of the St. Louis Blues NHL team, and his childhood coaches included former Blues players Keith Tkachuk and David Backes. After two seasons at De Smet Jesuit High School, he was recruited for the USA Hockey National Team Development Program in 2013, with whom he appeared in multiple international tournaments, including the World U-17 Hockey Challenge and IIHF World U18 Championship. While with the USA Hockey program, Frederic committed to join the Wisconsin Badgers college ice hockey program for their 2016–17 season. The Badgers lost the Big Ten Conference championships both seasons Frederic was there, but he scored 15 and 17 goals in those two seasons, respectively. After his sophomore year, Frederic chose to leave Wisconsin in order to sign with the Bruins.

Frederic's push to become the Bruins' third-line center in the  season did not work out: he had a chance at the role in February 2019, but was sent back down to the Providence Bruins of the American Hockey League (AHL) after 11 scoreless outings. Frederic remained with Providence for the  season, save for two NHL games in place of an injured Zachary Senyshyn, and had 32 AHL points by the time that the COVID-19 pandemic brought the season to a premature end. Frederic had a permanent position in the Bruins' NHL roster the following season until he contracted a mysterious illness in April, after which he was used only sparingly.

Early life 
Frederic was born on February 11, 1998, in St. Louis, Missouri, to Bob and Gaye Frederic, both lifelong fans of the St. Louis Blues of the National Hockey League (NHL). Raised a Blues fan, Frederic's favorite hockey players as a child were Keith Tkachuk and David Backes, and as he began playing hockey himself, he would model his playing style after that of Backes. He played three sports throughout his childhood, all of which were coached by former professionals: Frederic's hockey coaches were Tkachuk and Jeff Brown, the quarterback coach on his American football team was Gus Frerotte, and Mike Matheny coached him in Little League Baseball. Frederic spent two years as a three-sport athlete for De Smet Jesuit High School before October 2013, when the USA Hockey National Team Development Program noticed him at a minor ice hockey tournament and recruited him for their program. He spent two years in the development program, scoring seven goals and 12 assists for a total of 19 points in 58 United States Hockey League games.

Playing career

NCAA 
On April 18, 2014, Frederic committed to play college ice hockey for the Wisconsin Badgers beginning in the 2016–17 season. The summer before joining the Badgers, Frederic, who had previously been recruited by the Boston University Terriers, was selected by the Boston Bruins in the first round, 29th overall, of the 2016 NHL Entry Draft. Despite being drafted, Frederic committed to Wisconsin, and he scored his first collegiate goal on October 8, 2016, as part of a 6–5 defeat of the Northern Michigan Wildcats. With six points in his first four games, including a four-point game against the Boston College Eagles, Frederic was named the Big Ten Conference's Second Star of the Week for the week ending October 18. After breaking his hand in practice on November 17, the Badgers' goals per game dropped from 3.75 in the eight games he had played to 2.67 in the six games he missed. Centering a line with Cameron Hughes and Luke Kunin, Frederic was second to Kunin with 15 goals and 33 points in 30 regular season games. Although the Badgers lost the Big Ten tournament to Penn State in double overtime, thus keeping them out of the NCAA tournament, Frederic was named the Big Ten Men's Ice Hockey Freshman of the Year, as well as the recipient of the Spike Carlson–Chris Chelios Award for the Badgers' most valuable player (MVP). He was also named to both the All-Big Ten Second Team and Freshman Team.

When Hughes was promoted to Badgers captain shortly before the 2017–18 season, Frederic became one of four alternate captains. He struggled in the first half of the regular season, dropping from 1.1 points per game during his freshman year to 0.76 as a sophomore, in part because his opponents were targeting him. In an effort to remedy this, coach Tony Granato dropped Frederic from the first to the third offensive line, where he centered Matthew Freytag and Sean Dhooghe. On February 7, after back-to-back three-point outings against the Michigan Wolverines, Frederic was named the Big Ten second star of the week. Although Frederic delivered two goals in the Big Ten tournament game, the Badgers lost to Michigan 7–4 and were kept once again from the NCAA tournament. Frederic had 17 goals and 32 points in 36 regular season games for the Badgers that year and was named an All-Big Ten honorable mention, but had two four-game scoring droughts as Wisconsin finished the season 14–19–4. After the 2017–18 season ended, Frederic signed a three-year, entry-level contract with the Bruins, ending his college hockey career.

Professional 
Frederic's contract with the Bruins started during the  season, but he was able to finish out the  season with the Providence Bruins, Boston's American Hockey League (AHL) affiliate, on an amateur tryout contract. He played in 13 regular season games for Providence, recording five goals and eight points in the process, and contributed an additional assist in three postseason games.

The offseason departure of Riley Nash to the Columbus Blue Jackets left the Bruins' third-line center position open for the  season, and Frederic entered training camp in contention with Jack Studnicka and Jakob Forsbacka Karlsson for the role. Veterans David Backes and Sean Kuraly were ultimately awarded the job, while Frederic and his competitors were sent back to Providence. Ultimately, however, the third-line center became a rotating position, and Frederic was called up from Providence on January 29 to try out the role. He made his NHL debut that night, skating alongside his childhood hero Backes, and received a five-minute major penalty for fighting with Winnipeg Jets forward Brandon Tanev. After 11 scoreless games for Boston, Frederic was sent back down to Providence on February 22, shortly before the trading deadline, in order to clear salary cap space for new acquisition Charlie Coyle. Ultimately, Frederic played in 15 NHL games during the 2018–19 season, with no goals or assists in any of them, but had 14 goals and 25 points in 55 games with Providence.

Although he began the  season in Providence, injuries soon decimated the Bruins' offensive core, and Frederic was called up to Boston on November 14 to replace an injured Zach Senyshyn. He skated on the third line with Par Lindholm and Danton Heinen, playing on the left wing instead of his usual center. His call-up was short-lived, as Frederic, Paul Carey, and Urho Vaakanainen were all sent down to Providence on November 18 to make room for Jake DeBrusk, Patrice Bergeron, and Brett Ritchie, all of whom were returning from their respective injuries. Although he played in only two NHL games that season, Frederic made a much larger impact in the AHL, where he scored eight goals and 32 points in 59 regular season games, all while leading the league with 148 penalty minutes. By the time that the AHL season was canceled in March due to the COVID-19 pandemic, the Providence Bruins were on a 12-game winning streak and were poised to take the No. 1 seed in the Eastern Conference. When the NHL returned to play for the 2020 Stanley Cup playoffs, Frederic was one of 31 players selected to join the team in the Toronto "bubble". He contracted the COVID-19 virus during the pre-playoff training camp, however, and could not play with the team during their postseason run.

Frederic opened the  season as a member of the Bruins' taxi squad, ready to fill in for either Craig Smith or Brad Marchand as needed. After cementing his place on the Bruins lineup by way of fighting with P. K. Subban of the New Jersey Devils early in the season, Frederic finally picked up his first NHL point on January 23, an assist on Coyle's goal in a 3–1 defeat of the Philadelphia Flyers. His first NHL goal also came against the Flyers, a second-period shot past Carter Hart during the NHL Outdoors at Lake Tahoe game on February 21. What was poised to be a strong rookie season for Frederic was suddenly derailed aftar April 6, when he contracted a mysterious, non-COVID-19 illness. Frederic suffered a fever of over  that sidelined him for some time, and when the Bruins acquired Curtis Lazar and Taylor Hall in a late-season trade with the Buffalo Sabres, it was difficult for Frederic to find his way back into the lineup. After contracting the illness, he made only six more regular-season appearances for Boston. He scored four goals and one assist in 42 regular season games, but did not make an appearance in any of the Bruins' 11 games at the 2021 Stanley Cup playoffs, even when the fourth line wavered and Boston eventually fell to the New York Islanders.

An impending restricted free agent after the 2020–21 season, Frederic signed a two-year, $2.1 million contract extension with the Bruins on June 25, 2021. Shortly thereafter, he was one of the seven forwards that the Bruins chose to protect in the 2021 NHL Expansion Draft. He was taken out of the Bruins'  lineup on November 9 after an unexpected hit from Josh Brown of the Ottawa Senators caused an upper body injury.

International play

Frederic's tenure with the National Team Development Program allowed him to represent the United States at a number of international tournaments, beginning with the 2014 World Under-17 Hockey Challenge, where he recorded one goal and one assist in six games of Team USA's silver-medal finish. The following year, Frederic helped the United States to a bronze medal with four goals and three assists in the 2016 IIHF World U18 Championships, including a hat-trick in the team's 12–1 opening-round rout of Latvia. Two years later, he won another bronze medal, this time contributing five goals in seven games for the United States junior team at the 2018 World Junior Ice Hockey Championships. Four of these goals came in the bronze medal game, where the US team defeated the Czech Republic 9–3.

Fighting 
His penchant for fighting began as a child, when he and his brother Grant would practice hitting each other in a makeshift basement roller rink. Most of his fights have come from a self-professed desire to help his teammates, such as when he battled Tommy Cross of the Springfield Thunderbirds after Cross elbowed Cameron Hughes in the head. Boston coach Bruce Cassidy has praised Frederic's discipline and control in picking his battles and has encouraged him to become an enforcer. Cassidy and teammate Brad Marchand, himself a notorious pest, have also praised Frederic's ability to draw penalties from his opponents by agitating them into a fight or another infraction.

Personal life 
Frederic's older brother Grant is also a hockey player, and the two would often face each other while Trent played with the US national team and Grant was with the Green Bay Gamblers. Grant spent four years playing college ice hockey for the Miami RedHawks before signing with the Adirondack Thunder of the ECHL in 2020.

Career statistics

Regular season and playoffs

International

Awards and honors

References

External links

 

1998 births
Living people
American men's ice hockey centers
Boston Bruins draft picks
Boston Bruins players
Ice hockey people from St. Louis
National Hockey League first-round draft picks
Providence Bruins players
USA Hockey National Team Development Program players
Wisconsin Badgers men's ice hockey players